Meshkabad may refer to:
 Meshkabad-e Qadim, East Azerbaijan Province
 Meshkabad-e Bala, Mazandaran Province
 Meshkabad-e Pain, Mazandaran Province